George Frederick Higgins (25 December 1868 – 19 August 1951) was an English cricketer active from 1894 to 1895 who played for Essex. He was born in London and died in Woodford Green. He appeared in nine first-class matches as a righthanded batsman who scored 306 runs with a highest score of 118.

Notes

1868 births
1951 deaths
English cricketers
Essex cricketers